Nuclear bodies (also known as nuclear domains, or nuclear dots) are membraneless structures found in the cell nuclei of eukaryotic cells. Nuclear bodies include Cajal bodies, the nucleolus, and promyelocytic leukemia protein (PML) nuclear bodies (also called PML oncogenic dots). Nuclear bodies also include ND10s. ND stands for nuclear domain, and 10 refers to the number of dots seen.

Nuclear bodies were first seen as prominent interchromatin structures in the nuclei of malignant or hyperstimulated animal cells identified using anti-sp100 autoantibodies from primary biliary cirrhosis and subsequently the promyelocytic leukemia (PML) factor, but appear also to be elevated in many autoimmune and cancerous diseases.  Nuclear dots are metabolically stable and resistant to nuclease digestion and salt extraction.

A nuclear body subtype is a clastosome suggested to be a site of protein degradation.

Structure 

Simple nuclear bodies (types I and II) and the shells of complex nuclear bodies (types III, IVa and V) consist of a non-chromatinic fibrillar material which is most likely proteinaceous. That nuclear bodies co-isolated with the nuclear matrix, and were linked to the fibrogranular nuclear matrix component by projections from the surface of the nuclear bodies. The primary components of the nuclear dots are the proteins sp100 nuclear antigen, LYSP100(a homolog of sp100), ISG20, PML antigen, NDP55 and 53kDa protein associated with the nuclear matrix. Other proteins, such as PIC1/SUMO-1, which are associated with nuclear pore complex also associate with nuclear dots. The proteins can reorganize in the nucleus, by increasing number of dispersion in response to different stress (stimulation or heat shock, respectively).

Function 
One of the nuclear body proteins appears to be involved in transcriptional active regions.  Expression of PML antigen and sp100 is responsive to interferons. Sp100 seems to have transcriptional transactivating properties. PML protein was reported to suppress growth and transformation, and specifically inhibits the infection of vesicular stomatitis virus (VSV) (a rhabdovirus) and influenza A virus, but not other types of viruses. The SUMO-1 ubiquitin like protein is responsible for modifying PML protein such that it is targeted to dots. whereas overexpression of PML results in programmed cell death.

One hypothesized function of the dots is as a 'nuclear dump' or 'storage depot'.
 The nuclear bodies may not all perform the same function. Sp140 associates with certain bodies and appears to be involved in transcriptional activation.

ND10 nuclear bodies have been shown to play a major role in chromatin regulation.

Pathology 

These, or similar, bodies have been found increased in the presence of lymphoid cancers and SLE (lupus). They are also observed at higher frequencies in
subacute sclerosing panencephalitis; in this instance, antibodies to measles show expression in and localization to the nuclear bodies.

 In promyelocytic leukemia (PML), the oncogenic PML-retinoic acid receptor alpha (RARalpha) chimera disrupts the normal concentration of PML in nuclear bodies. Administration of arsenic trioxide (As2O3) plus all-trans retinoic acid (Tretinoin) causes remission of this leukemia by triggering the bodies' reorganization. As2O3 destroys the chimera, allowing new SUMO-1 ubiquitinated PML to relocalize to nuclear bodies. Retinoic acid induces a caspase-3 mediated degradation of the same chimera.
 In HHV, ICP0 disrupts nuclear dots in the early stage of infection.

References 

Autoimmune diseases
D
Autoantigens
Cell nucleus